What Life Would Be Like is the fifth studio album by Christian rock band, Big Daddy Weave. It was released on July 22, 2008.  The album charted at no. 15 on the Billboard's chart on August 9, 2008 in the Christian Albums category.

Track listing

Personnel 

Big Daddy Weave
 Mike Weaver – lead vocals, acoustic guitars 
 Jeremy Redmon – electric guitars, mandolin, programming, backing vocals 
 Joe Shirk – keyboards, saxophone, backing vocals 
 Jay Weaver – bass guitar, backing vocals 
 Jeff Jones – drums

Additional musicians
 Matt Gilder – keyboards
 Dan Dugmore – dobro (6), mandolin (6)
 Lauren Morris – strings (4, 9)
 Matt Nelson – strings (4, 9), string arrangements (4, 9)
 Emily Walsh – strings (4, 9)
 Claire Whitcomb – strings (4, 9)
 Lee Barren – trombone (10)
 Rodney Mills – trombone (10)
 Tommy Vaughan – trumpet (10), horn arrangements (10)
 Anna Redmon – backing vocals 
 David Leonard – backing vocals

Production
 Jeremy Redmon – producer, overdub recording 
 Christopher Stevens – co-producer (2)
 Bryan White – co-producer (2), overdub recording (2)
 Josh Bailey – executive producer 
 Susan Riley – executive producer
 Jason Jenkins – A&R 
 Shane D. Wilson – engineer, mixing
 Scott Velazco – assistant engineer 
 Sarah Deane – mix coordinator 
 Andrew Mendelson – mastering 
 Katherine Petillo – creative director
 Roy Roper – design 
 Ben Pearson – photography
 Robin Geary – stylist 
 Kim Perrett – stylist

References

External links
Official album page

2008 albums
Big Daddy Weave albums
Fervent Records albums